Arthur Frederick Holt (8 August 1914 – 23 August 1995) was a hosiery manufacturer and Liberal Party politician in the United Kingdom, and Member of Parliament for thirteen years.

Background
Holt was born in Bolton. He was educated at Mill Hill School and Victoria University of Manchester. In 1939 he married Kathleen Mary Openshaw, MBE. They had one son and one daughter. He played Rugby for Bolton RUFC.

Professional career
Holt joined the Loyal Regiment as a Territorial Army officer in 1938 and left the Territorial Army Reserve of Officers in 1964. He was company commander in the Reconnaissance Corps and was taken prisoner at the fall of Singapore in 1942. He was twice mentioned in dispatches.

Holt was a hosiery manufacturer. With his two brothers he built up in Bolton an industry new to the town. He was Chairman, Holt Hosiery Co. Ltd, Bolton, 1971–73.

Political career
Holt was first elected at the 1951 general election, when he defeated the only other candidate in the Bolton West constituency, sitting Labour MP John Lewis. Holt was re-elected in straight contests with Labour at two further general elections. He was Parliamentary Chairman of the Liberal Party from 1952 to 1955. He was a Member of the Parliamentary
delegation to Russia in 1954. He was Liberal Chief Whip from 1962 to 1963. His share of the vote was halved when the Conservative Party fielded a candidate at the 1964 general elections, and the seat was won by Labour's Gordon Oakes. He was President of the Liberal Party from 1974 to 1975.

Electoral record

References

1914 births
1995 deaths
Liberal Party (UK) MPs for English constituencies
Presidents of the Liberal Party (UK)
UK MPs 1951–1955
UK MPs 1955–1959
UK MPs 1959–1964
Members of the Parliament of the United Kingdom for Bolton West
People educated at Mill Hill School
Alumni of the Victoria University of Manchester
British Army personnel of World War II
Loyal Regiment officers
British World War II prisoners of war
Reconnaissance Corps officers
World War II prisoners of war held by Japan
Military personnel from Lancashire